Lewis Carroll’s 1865 novel Alice's Adventures in Wonderland has been translated into 175 languages. The language with the most editions of the Alice in Wonderland novels in translation is Japanese, with 1,271 editions. Some translations, with the first date of publishing and of reprints or re-editions by other publishers, are:

See also

Translations of Through the Looking-Glass, Carroll's 1871 sequel

References

Literature
 
 

Alice's Adventures in Wonderland
Alice's Adventures in Wonderland
Lists of fantasy books
Children's literature bibliographies